Hohenzollern is a mountain, of Baden-Württemberg, Germany. It is located in Zollernalbkreis. The famous Hohenzollern Castle is located on its top.

Mountains and hills of the Swabian Jura
Bisingen
Hechingen